Spasoje Tuševljak (born 28 May 1952) is a Bosnian economist and former politician. He served as the 1st Chairman of the Council of Ministers of Bosnia and Herzegovina from 6 June until 18 October 2000. Tuševljak was also Minister of Finance and Treasury from 22 June 2000 until 22 February 2001.

Biography
Tuševljak is a professor at the Faculty of Economy in East Sarajevo. At the beginning of the war in Bosnia and Hezegovina, Tuševljak managed affairs between Republika Srpska and FR Yugoslavia. As he had good relations with the Government of Republika Srpska, he was named a chief negotiator in the question of legal succession of the SFR Yugoslavia.

He was named the first Chairman of the Council of Ministers of Bosnia and Herzegovina as a member of the Serb Democratic Party. He held office between June and October 2000. He was the Minister of Finance and Treasury from June 2000 to February 2001.

References

|-

1952 births
Living people
Politicians of Republika Srpska
Prime Ministers of Bosnia and Herzegovina
Finance ministers of Bosnia and Herzegovina
Serbs of Bosnia and Herzegovina